Alassane Diallo (born 17 April 1989) is a Senegalese footballer who plays as a forward, most recently for Al-Shorta in the Iraqi Premier League.

Honours

Club
Al-Shorta
 Iraqi Premier League: 2018–19

References

External links

1989 births
Living people
Senegalese footballers
Al-Shorta SC players
Association football forwards
Expatriate footballers in Iraq
Senegalese expatriate sportspeople in Iraq